Knut Jacobsen (11 November 1885 – 22 February 1976) was a Norwegian banker and politician.
Jacobsen was born in Haugesund to merchant Svend Jacobsen and Berta Karine Rossebø. He was elected representative to the Stortinget for the period 1934–1936, for the Conservative Party.

References

1885 births
1976 deaths
People from Haugesund
Norwegian bankers
Conservative Party (Norway) politicians
Members of the Storting